is a 1958 black-and-white Japanese film directed by Katsuhiko Tasaka.

Plot 
A traveler named Genta asked me to catch Miyoshi Mujuku Miyoshi and make him a younger brother. He was good at magic tricks. That night, at the house of Nibei in Oiwake-shuku, where I stayed, I immediately paid money using magic tricks and had him buy sake. Nibei was old and sympathized with the deserted family. The daughter, Okin, supported her house in the guise of a man, trying to keep her brother Taroyoshi strong. --Eigoro Omaeda left home to give his brother a trace, and Inui and his friends were looking for him. At the request of Miyoshi, Genta boarded the gambling house where Nibei's former Inui was entrusted with the emerging boss Bon Goza called Senemon, a wholesale store. With his magic trick, he got rid of money and came back. Genta, who was struck by Miyoshi again, boarded the inn where they were gathering for the revenge. When they tried to slash, Genta immediately impersonated Eigoro and withdrew triumphantly. Everyone was disappointed. Daigoro of the law seal also came to greet me. Silk became more and more fond of him. --- That night, Genta and Miyoshi tried to escape at night. However, the shape of the Senemon is in the soil. When the silk noticed and rushed to the riverbank with Nibei and others, Genta was helped by Sanji and was fighting against Senemon and others. Eigoro's Inui-Ban-nabe Seiroku and others who received the news from Daigoro also helped, and the villain was destroyed. Miyoshi was --- Eigoro. With Genta-the breath of the samurai, he was running away from home for the same reason. In front of the calling silk and his younger brother, Genta made a major product of the first generation. He disappeared somewhere, leaving the cap and the feathers in a humanoid shape.

Cast 
 Raizo Ichikawa
 Yōko Uraji
 Jun Negami
 Tokiko Mita

References

External links 
  http://www.raizofan.net/link4/movie3/tabi.htm

Japanese black-and-white films
1958 films
Films directed by Katsuhiko Tasaka
Daiei Film films
1950s Japanese films